Samsung Galaxy A71 is an Android smartphone designed, developed, marketed, and manufactured by Samsung Electronics as part of its sixth-generation Galaxy A series. 

The A71 line consists of SM-A715F/DS, SM-A715F/DSN and SM-A715F/DSM. Key upgrades over the previous model, the Samsung Galaxy A70, include the Android 10 operating system, the Qualcomm Snapdragon 730 chipset, and the camera system. It was announced in December 2019 and released in January 2020.

The phone has a Super AMOLED Plus FHD+ 6.7" display, a 64 MP wide, 12 MP ultrawide, 5 MP depth, and 5 MP macro camera, a 4500 mAh battery, and an under display optical fingerprint scanner.

A standard 5G variant of the phone was introduced in April 2020, as well as a 5G UW variant in July 2020.

Specifications

Hardware
The Galaxy A71 has a 6.7 " Super AMOLED Plus Infinity O display with an FHD+ 1080x2400 resolution with a 20:9 aspect ratio and a ~393 ppi density with Corning Gorilla Glass 3. The phone itself measures  x  x  and weighs  whereas the 5G variant measures 162.5 mm (6.40 in) x 75.5 mm (2.97 in) x 8.1 mm (0.32 in) and weighs 185 g (6.5 oz). The phone is powered by a Qualcomm Snapdragon 730 (8 nm) octa-core (2x2.2 GHz Kryo 470 Gold & 6x1.8 GHz Kryo 470 Silver) chip and an Adreno 618 GPU. The 5G variant is powered by an Exynos 980 (8 nm) octa-core (2x2.2 GHz Cortex-A77 & 6x1.8 GHz Cortex-A55) alongside a Mali-G76 MP5 GPU, and the 5G UW variant is powered by a Qualcomm Snapdragon 765G (7 nm) octa-core (1x2.4 GHz Kryo 475 Prime & 1x2.2 GHz Kryo 475 Gold & 6x1.8 GHz Kryo 475 Silver) and an Adreno 620 GPU. The phone comes with either 6GB or 8GB RAM as well as 128GB internal storage, which can be expanded via a microSD card of up to 512GB. It comes with a non-removable 4500mAh lithium polymer battery which charges with a 25W Super Fast Charger. It also has an in-display optical fingerprint sensor.

Cameras
The Samsung Galaxy A71 has a four-camera setup arranged in an "L" shape located in the corner with a rectangular protrusion similar to that of the iPhone 11 and the Pixel 4. The array consists of a 64 MP wide angle camera, a 12 MP ultrawide camera, a 5 MP macro camera, and a 5 MP depth sensor. It also has a single 32 MP front facing camera, which sits in a small punch hole on the front of the screen. The rear facing cameras can record video up to 4K in 30 fps, as well as 1080p in 30, 240, and 960 fps. The front cameras can shoot 1080p at 30 fps. The rear cameras also have Super Steady EIS.

Software
The Galaxy A71 comes with Android 10 and One UI 2. The phone also has Samsung Knox for added system security. Currently, it has been updated to Android 13 with One UI 5.0

On 18 August 2020, it was announced by Samsung that select Galaxy devices would be supported for three generations of Android software updates, of which the A71 was included.

On 2 December 2020, the Galaxy A71 was announced to be eligible for the Android 11 upgrade with One UI 3. 

Owing to the A71 being listed for three generations of Android software updates, it's highly likely that the A71 will receive two more major Android upgrades after receiving Android 11.

History
The Samsung Galaxy A71 was announced and released in December of 2019 along with the Galaxy A51. Samsung later announced a 5G variant in April 2020 featuring an Exynos 980 SoC. A 5G ultra-wideband version with mmWave support is exclusive to Verizon.

See also
Samsung Galaxy A51
Samsung Galaxy A70
Samsung Galaxy A series

References

Samsung Galaxy
Phablets
Mobile phones introduced in 2019
Android (operating system) devices
Mobile phones with multiple rear cameras
Mobile phones with 4K video recording